The DAF XF is a range of semi trucks produced since 1997 by DAF Trucks. The XF 105 won the International Truck of the Year 2007 award. The truck features a 12.9 litre (PACCAR MX 11 or 13) engine and ZF AS Tronic gearbox in both manual and automatic formats.

DAF XG 
Starting with the 2021 generation, the larger cab variants of the XF are named XG and XG+.

Military use 
The military variant of the DAF XF 95 series is called DAF SSC.

The Canadian Forces Land Force Command uses the XF95 Tropco Tractor for their tank transport platform leased from the Dutch Army.

Gallery

Notes

External links
official website

XF
XF
Tank transporters
Vehicles introduced in 1997
Cab over vehicles